Masoob is a traditional Yemeni dessert. Masoob is a banana-based dessert made from over-ripe bananas, ground flat bread, cream, cheese, dates, and honey. It is popular in Yemen, Saudi Arabia and the UAE.

References

Yemeni desserts
Bananas